Akra Township is a township in Pembina County, North Dakota, United States.

History
Akra Township was organized in 1882, and was known as one of the "Icelandic Townships," due to its large population of Icelanders who had settled here. Akra takes its name from Akranes, Iceland, a town near Reykjavík.
Akra Township was a "double township," spanning two full survey townships. In 1888, the northern part of the township was separated and organized separately as Avon Township (now Advance Township).

Geography
Icelandic State Park and the adjacent Renwick Dam and Lake Renwick are located in Akra Township.

References

Icelandic-American culture in North Dakota
Townships in Pembina County, North Dakota
Populated places established in 1882
Townships in North Dakota